Curtis Circulation Company, LLC (abbreviated as CC), is a magazine distribution company.

History
Curtis Circulation Company began as the circulation department of the Philadelphia-based Curtis Publishing Company, publisher of The Saturday Evening Post, Ladies' Home Journal, and Holiday; Curtis Circulation became a subsidiary in 1946.

Besides the publishing company's own magazines, other titles distributed by Curtis Circulation included The Atlantic and Esquire. One of Curtis' most notable clients in the 1950s was Classics Illustrated, which Curtis distributed, starting first in Canada in 1948, and then nationally in the U.S. beginning in 1951. 

In 1969, Perfect Film & Chemical Corporation purchased Curtis Circulation from the Curtis Publishing Company. Beginning in 1969 (and lasting until 1995), Curtis became the distributor of Marvel Comics (Perfect Film had bought out publisher Martin Goodman—owner of Magazine Management Company, the parent of Marvel Comics in 1968).

Joseph M. Walsh (1944–2016) became president of Curtis Circulation in 1970 (he also held high-ranking titles at its parent company, Cadence). 

In 1973, Perfect Film renamed itself Cadence Industries. In 1978, CC was the U.S.'s largest magazine distributor. 

In 1982, Joseph M. Walsh became Chairman and CEO of Curtis, acquiring an ownership stake. 

Cadence Industries was liquidated in 1986, selling Curtis Circulation to Hachette Distribution Services (a division of the Lagardère Group); Walsh retained his ownership stake.

Comag Marketing Group (CMG) acquired Curtis Circulation Company, effective October 1, 2019

See also 
 Curtis Magazines

References

Marketing companies established in 1946
Comics industry
Distributors
1946 establishments in Pennsylvania